The Disinformation Project is an independent, interdisciplinary and non-government  New Zealand research team that has been collecting and analysing data on the causes and impact of mis- and disinformation within the country's society from the early days of  the COVID-19 pandemic in 2020 through to, and beyond, the 2022 Wellington protest when the grounds of Parliament House and surrounding streets were occupied by anti-vaccine and anti-mandate groups. Research by the Project identifies how the digital world, shaped by social media platforms globally, has the potential to normalise hateful and violent ideas that some political structures have historically used to create narratives and realities which, by social exclusion and marginalisation, can control groups within a society by increasing their vulnerability to disinformation.

Methodology and positions

The Disinformation Project's research makes use of mixed methods combining open and quantitative data from social media platforms, social and mainstream media and other forms of information-sharing, looking for patterns and meaning in super-spreader events and qualitative research and discourse analysis to identify shifts over time.

Key to the Project's research is the assessment of how scientific uncertainty, due to the presentation and distribution of unreliable information within the context of an infodemic, can manifest as narratives that link to conspiracy theories. The project holds that while some people might have genuine reasons to be wary of the state and mainstream media, they can be influenced by those holding conspiracy theories or extremist beliefs in social media spaces that appear to offer support, but are often driven by groups with different agendas. The position is therefore taken that "those most marginalised by or disaffected within contemporary society, are more likely to have lived experiences that might make them more susceptible to unreliable sources and untrustworthy stories." Cultural historian and Project Director Kate Hannah has acknowledged the importance of showing empathy toward people who are "hoodwinked into extremist beliefs."

Exploring, what Hannah has described as "our shared information landscape", underpins the research of the project into how New Zealand society understands and manages the infodemic that has come to the fore as a result of COVID-19, but is rooted historically in the impact of colonisation on the health and wellbeing of individuals, families and communities within the country, increasing their vulnerability to mis- and disinformation. The stance of the project is that: "people who are grounded, situated, enabled to flourish and contribute, and connected to others are far less likely to experience negative health outcomes and far less likely to experience other negative outcomes: disconnection, information disorders, social exclusion, and participation in fragmented realities."

The researchers take the position that the lack of a shared narrative can shape how a country understands and builds its "historical memory" and the storming of the Capitol in the United States in January 2021 is given as an example of how this can be influenced by "contemporary myths [which] are known by many names – conspiracy theories, fake news, and moral panics."  As events such as these begin to influence the international information landscape, the researchers contend that their work is to support Aotearoa New Zealand to develop values that are "democratic, inclusive, and progressive" to consolidate social cohesion built on trust and cooperation. The potential of the Treaty of Waitangi to enable a partnership is cited as a "necessary starting point for any discussion or development of a strategy which seeks to address and make redress for the impacts of online harm, hateful and violent extremism, and disinformation for Aotearoa New Zealand...[and]...it is from a position of the partnership that Te Tiriti provides that Aotearoa can make a global contribution to these pressing and immediate issues."

On the issue of government censorship as a legitimate approach to managing misinformation, Hannah said in the media on behalf of the Project, that establishing lawfulness of public information is [a] "complex, thorny, multi-pronged issue that takes a multi-agency approach" and expressed the importance of people being "self-regulating...[talking to each other]...at an interpersonal community-based level. We don't want to increase censorship."

Research focus areas

Changing narratives 2020–2021

In February 2020 the team began researching data on mis- and disinformation related to COVID-19 on social and mainstream media and other forms of information sharing in New Zealand. Between March and May 2020, it was said that the infodemic in the country was mostly driven by stories on social media or reported on and discussed in the media that were easy to identify as unreliable and based on misinformation. Some of these included a "distrust in government or other official health information regarding the virus and its effects; disputed or speculated on the origin of the virus, including denying its existence, and a number of health and wellbeing narratives grounded in the rejection of mainstream medical advice" but by August, the narratives had changed to a more extreme distrust in the authority of the state in general. Hannah has said that COVID-19 lockdowns in New Zealand had resulted in some people becoming disconnected from their local communities, often looking to fill this in online spaces where they might feel listened to, informed and respected.  There is a danger, according to Hannah, that within these online groups, discussions about genuinely important social issues might be influenced by disinformation, pushing people into extremist views.

By August 2020, the work had extended to a wider approach of studying mis- and disinformation ecosystems in New Zealand, including the causes and effects of actions such as "dangerous speech, hateful expression, and criminal behaviour" and how these aligned with "global trends, themes, narratives, and actors who influence online harms in Aotearoa." In a later paper, the researchers reflected that within New Zealand by November 2021, there had been emerging patterns in the "nature, nature and significant nodes of disinformation", evident in a "shift from vaccine hesitancy to vaccine resistance, increasingly competing ideas regarding State versus individual rights, and the normalisation of the targeting of individuals and communities with online and offline harassment."

A 2021 report by the Project covering the period of 17 August to 5 November, is reported in the media as showing a "rapid trajectory of growth and spread of "dangerous speech, hateful expression and criminal behaviour...on a range of platforms from Telegram to Facebook and Instagram." In 2022 Kayli Taylor, a researcher with the Disinformation Project, wrote in a paper that research by the Project indicated dangerous and hate speech in New Zealand is being "justified" in online media.  Analysis of data from social media is noted by Taylor as an indicator that this "incited and normalised violence against minority groups..[including but not limited to]... Māori, other ethnic minorities, women and gender minorities, Queer/LGBTQ+ people, and those with disabilities", placing these communities at risk of experiencing "significant and growing harms."

Research by the Project has been said to show that disinformation was becoming "sophisticated, motivated, adaptive, resilient, increasingly violent and significantly volatile...[with a]...shift from vaccine hesitancy to vaccine resistance...[pushing]...various far-Right and conservative views from gun control, rural land rights and 1080, Māori sovereignty land rights, free speech, abortion, euthanasia and cannabis law reform." The Project identified that disinformation related to COVID-19 reflecting far right ideologies, was becoming more intense and popular within the New Zealand populace.

Hannah suggested that "minimization of Covid-19 has been like a Trojan horse...it has become a really significant recruitment tool and then has created an ability to coalesce around a set of ideas that are anti the state."

Occupation of the New Zealand parliament grounds 2022

After the initial occupation in February 2022, the Disinformation Project monitored social media and identified a small group that was responsible for the spreading of the majority of false information during and after the event. The researchers claimed that during the occupation a great number of New Zealanders were exposed to a "splintered reality...[and pushed toward]...racist and violent ideologies." The open-source data was gathered from posts on websites [that] "ranged from mainstream platforms like Facebook, Twitter, Instagram and YouTube, to channels linked to the far right, such as Telegram, Rumble, Odysee, Gab and Gettr", with analysis showing a major increase in online traffic at the time in these spaces that often encourage disinformation.  After a clash between police and protestors on 2 March, the data showed that the "subscriber count...across 140 Telegram channels and chat groups they track" had risen from 307,613 by the beginning of the occupation to 353, 377, with "73 percent of Facebook interactions over misinformation and disinformation [being] traced back to just 12 accounts – or what the analysts likened to New Zealand's version of the infamous Disinformation Dozen". In the same article, Hannah noted: "The parliamentary protest exposed more New Zealanders to disinformation and revealed more splintering of reality, to the extent that the mass shooting in Buffalo, which was inspired by the Christchurch mosque terrorist attacks, is widely now discussed within disinformation social media spaces as 'another false flag'."

Hannah told Kathryn Ryan that the Project's research had noted a swing towards disinformation since August 2021, and while there was considerable interest in what was happening at parliament with wide coverage in all forms of media,  many people got their information from places that were "completely grounded in a different interpretation and a different reality of what was going on." In another media interview, Hannah noted how she and her colleagues in the Disinformation Project were particularly concerned that "extreme misogyny and racism...including anti-Māori, Islamophobic and antisemitic sentiment," was affecting the freedom of some to fully participate in public life. In May 2022, Kayli Taylor expressed concerns, based on data, that "the Parliament Protest [had] entrenched violent expression...toxic masculinities, and other hallmarks of dangerous speech as the norm within anti-mandate and anti-vaccine social media ecologies", effectively undermining "civic life, political culture, and inclusion – pillars of social cohesion." Journalist Toby Manhire in a comprehensive coverage of the Project's research, prefaced his article with: Super-spreaders of misinformation and conspiracy theory outstripped mainstream outlets in reaching online audiences, opening up two divergent realities...[and]...the 23-day occupation of parliament grounds, which came to a fiery, violent end...engendered – and fed on – an unprecedented surge in the sharing of disinformation and conspiracy theory across digital platforms in New Zealand

It was reported in the Otago Daily Times on 18 May 2022, that there was evidence "Russian-linked propaganda and disinformation" was being shared at the occupation site, including posts featuring the Ukrainian flag as a "symbol for paedophiles." Marc Daalder, a senior political reporter at Newsroom NZ, wrote that Research Fellow Sanjana Hattotuwa, in his role as a researcher for the Disinformation Project, had monitored "more than 100 Telegram channels and dozens of Facebook, YouTube, Instagram and Twitter accounts", and the data had shown that "the Russian invasion of Ukraine was one of the two dominant topics in New Zealand anti-vax forums...and the discussion is uniformly pro-Putin." This is said in the article to be a new development within the communities that the Project has been following, with Hattotuwa noting that Russian news had shown scenes of the protest at parliament which could have added some legitimacy to the occupation and contributed to increasing amounts of pro-Kremlin content in the New Zealand online space.  Hottotuwa concludes that online landscapes studied by the Disinformation Project, had become "gripped by a very partisan, statist, anti-Ukrainian, anti-Semitic, harmful, toxic and virulently violent commentary around that original content. The pro-Putin, pro-Kremlin content is indistinguishable from QAnon conspiratorial."

When protestors returned to parliament in August 2022, Hannah said in a media interview that it had moved beyond COVID-19 and was more about getting unification around the idea of what New Zealand is and what it should be like. Protestors, she claimed, were being influenced by rhetoric from the protest leaders making false claims that "politicians, officials, journalists, academics and members of the healthcare system are responsible for what they describe as mass genocide or democide, which means the killing of a population by its government".

Researchers from the Disinformation Project, along with independent academics, were scheduled to present at two media-only information sessions on political disinformation planned for early November 2022.  However, the sessions were initially cancelled after invitations to attend, that had been privately sent, appeared on extremist Telegram channels with online users showing an intention to attend.  After making the decision, but before notifying attendees, Kate Hannah got a death threat by email because of the supposed "collusion of the Disinformation Project with the media".  This had previously happened frequently to Hannah who said in a documentary Web of Chaos, that she was on a list of people to be "executed...for implementing or supporting the Covid-19 framework", continuing a trend she identified [where] "experts and policymakers were targeted with increasingly abusive and violent rhetoric. Now even the people who study that rhetoric have become targets."

Threat to local government democracy
In August 2022, concerns were expressed by New Zealand councils that due to fewer candidates standing for election to local government roles, some positions may not be filled, or even contested.  A survey of elected members of councils has shown that many of them had "experienced racism, gender discrimination, or other forms of harmful behaviour while doing their job in public office." Disinformation Project researcher Sanjana Hattotuwa said it was of concern that some people putting themselves forward in this void are "unequivocally linked with mis- and disinformation production...[and]...had connections to those who, during the Parliament protest, explicitly and 'openly called for the armed insurrection of the Beehive' on livestreams." In the same piece Hattotuwa notes that in the United States people who held strong "anti-mandate, anti-science and anti-government views" had been elected to offices, and if this happened in New Zealand it could shape political debates to become more "abrasive and angry."

The Project noted at the time, that some proponents of disinformation were looking to disrupt New Zealand by encouraging their supporters to hide their affiliations and stand for councils and school Boards of Trustees.  Hannah warned the participation of candidates with such a fixed agenda to do harm to society, could result in diverse and marginalised candidates feeling less [included] "in these really critical parts of our social fabric and democracy." Hattotuwa worried that "new foundations" for disinformation had now been laid in New Zealand and would change how the country engaged with elections in the future.

It was revealed in the media after the local body elections in New Zealand that while two candidates with connections to conspiracy theories or misinformation were elected in the Southern region of the country, the majority were unsuccessful. Hattotuwa said it was good that most candidates with these connections were rejected but warned that this was new in elections and the possible threat should not be undermined, particularly if there was a lower voter turnout.

Historical and international contexts

When Kate Hannah spoke at He Whenua Taurikura Hui – New Zealand's Hui on Countering Terrorism and Violent Extremism  in June 2021, she took the position that "online harm, hateful or violent extremism, and disinformation are global issues" within a context of international structures such as "imperialism, colonisation, white supremacism, misogyny, Islamophobia, homophobia, antisemitism...[that shape]...the digital world [which] reflects the structural and systemic violence towards 'the other' which forms the basis of the physical world we inhabit." She situates the role of disinformation in promoting hateful and violent extremism in New Zealand within this context, holding that the challenge for the country, is to understand who 'the other' is by engaging with "conflicting narratives of national identities and understandings to evaluate and ascertain the meaning of radicalisation or extremism in the society." She notes that the digital world can promote ideas that increase the intensity and spread of hateful and violent ideas, which can become "normalised and legitimised" when discussed in offline forums by "politicians, academics, thought leaders, and civil society organisations."

References

Research in New Zealand
Disinformation